Joseph H. Jefferson is a Democratic member of the South Carolina House of Representatives, representing the 102nd District since 2004.

Background
Jefferson was born on May 31, 1947 to Joseph H. and Omega T. Jefferson. He graduated from St. Stephens High School and then attended Claflin University, where he earned a B.S. in 1970. Jefferson also attended the South Carolina Criminal Justice Academy Magistrate School in 1999. On May 30, 1970 he married Deloris Livingston and the couple has 3 children, Trena Mack, Marva Patterson, and Joseph III. Jefferson was a Specialist Assistant to Congressman Mendel Davis from 1972 to 1980, Chairman of the Berkeley County School Board and represented the Sixth Congressional District as a member of the South Carolina Department of Transportation Commission from 1994 to 1998. Jefferson served as a Magistrate Judge for Berkeley County for 32 years.

Jefferson currently serves as 2nd Vice Chair of the House Labor, Commerce and Industry Committee.

Notes

External links
Project Vote Smart - Representative Joe Jefferson Jr. (SC) profile
Follow the Money - Joseph Jefferson Jr
2006 2004 campaign contributions

1947 births
Living people
Democratic Party members of the South Carolina House of Representatives
Claflin University alumni
African-American state legislators in South Carolina
21st-century American politicians
21st-century African-American politicians
20th-century African-American people